Jagatsinghpur Lok Sabha Constituency is one of the 21 Lok Sabha (Parliamentary)  Constituencies in Odisha state in Eastern India.

Assembly segments
Assembly Constituencies which constitute this Parliamentary Constituency, after delimitation of Parliamentary Constituencies and Legislative Assembly Constituencies of 2008 are:

Assembly Constituencies which constituted this Parliamentary Constituency, before delimitation of Parliamentary Constituencies and Legislative Assembly Constituencies of 2008 are:
 Tirtol
 Ersama
 Balikuda
 Jagatsinghpur
 Gobindpur
 Nimapara
 Kakatpur

Members of Parliament
2019: Rajashree Mallick, Biju Janata Dal
2014: Kulamani Samal, Biju Janata Dal
2009: Bibhu Prasad Tarai, Communist Party of India
2004: Brahmananda Panda, Biju Janata Dal
1999: Trilochan Kanungo, Biju Janata Dal
1998: Ranjib Biswal, Indian National Congress
1996: Ranjib Biswal, Indian National Congress
1991: Lokanath Choudhary, Communist Party of India
1989: Lokanath Choudhary, Communist Party of India
1984: Lakshman Mallick, Indian National Congress
1980: Lakshman Mallick, Indian National Congress
1977: Pradyumna Kishore Bal, Janata Party

Election Result

2019 Election Result

2014 Election Result
In 2014 election, Biju Janata Dal candidate Kulamani Samal defeated Indian National Congress candidate Bibhu Prasad Tarai by a margin of 2,76,394 votes.

General Election 2009

References

Lok Sabha constituencies in Odisha
Jagatsinghpur district
Cuttack district
Puri district